Pararguda rufescens is a moth of the  family Lasiocampidae. It is known from Australia, including New South Wales, Queensland, South Australia, Tasmania, Victoria and Western Australia.

The wingspan is about 40 mm for males and 50 mm for females. Adults have brown wings with scalloped edges. The males have forewings that have nearly a right angle at the tornus.

The larvae feed on Eucalyptus cneorifolia. They are fawn and furry. The body has three black marks on the back, each having two small raised pink knobs. Pupation takes place in a silk cocoon spun between the leaves of their food plant.

References

Lasiocampidae
Moths described in 1855